The Khajurāho Hanumān inscription is an epigraphic record on the base of a colossal figure of Hanuman, located at the temple site of Khajuraho in Madhya Pradesh, India. The inscription dates to the tenth century CE. The Hanumān is under the protection of the Archaeological Survey of India, being listed as a monument of national importance.

Location
The inscription is on the base of a well-known image of Hanumān at Khajurāho. Because the figure is under worship and the shrine renovated, the inscription is not presently visible.

Publication
The inscription and the image of Hanumān are frequently mentioned in the literature on Khajurāho. The inscription was first noticed by Alexander Cunningham in the nineteenth century. D. R. Bhandarkar revisited the inscription in 1904 and published a new reading, in addition to a fresh interpretation of the date.

Description and Contents
The inscription is written in Sanskrit in three lines. The style of the characters supports a date in the tenth century CE.

Historical Significance
The Khajurāho inscription is of great importance for the history of Hinduism because it gives a date of 316. This is taken by historians to refer to the Harṣa era, giving thus a date of 922 in the common era. While there are certainly figures of Hanumān that are older than the tenth century, this inscription makes the Khajurāho image the oldest dated Hanumān currently known.

Text
The uncorrected text reads as follows:

Left side:
 oṃ gollāgāhīlapūtrasya
 saṃvatsro °300 10 6° māghaśudi 10°
 śrīhanumantaṃ g[o]llākaḥ praṇamati

Right side:
 gahilasya sutaḥ śrīmānhanumānpa
 vanātmajam  aṇukṛod dharmmam ā-
 lokya gollākāprākataṃ harim

Translation
part I
oṃ. [The record of] Gollā, son of Gāhīla. 
The year 316 on the 10th day of the bright fortnight in the month of Māgha. 
Gollāka bows to Śrī Hanumān.

part II
Gollāka, the son of Gahila, having beheld the umanifest Hari, 
 afterward made this religious work, the glorious Hanumān, the son of the wind.

See also
Indian inscriptions

References

External links
  Image by the Archaeological Survey of India

Sanskrit inscriptions in India
Khajuraho